The Estonian Indoor Athletics Championships is an annual indoor track and field competition organised by the Estonian Athletic Association, which serves as the national championship for the sport in Estonia. First held in 1963, the competition was established during the period of Soviet occupation, thus was limited to a sub-national scope for the Estonian Soviet Socialist Republic, as Estonia's athletes still competed at the national Soviet Indoor Athletics Championships. The Estonian Indoor Championships became the undisputed official national-level event for Estonia in 1992, following the dissolution of the Soviet Union.

Events
The following athletics events feature as standard on the Estonian Indoor Championships programme:

 Sprint: 60 m, 200 m, 400 m
 Distance track events: 800 m, 1500 m, 3000 m
 Hurdles: 60 m hurdles
 Jumps: long jump, triple jump, high jump, pole vault
 Throws: shot put
 Combined events: heptathlon (men), pentathlon (women)
 Walks: 5000 m walk (men), 3000 m walk (women)

The 200 m was first introduced in 1996. Women's triple jump was added in 1993 and women's pole vault in 1997 (in line with changes made at the international level in the period).

Championships records

Men

Women

Mixed

References 

Athletics competitions in Estonia
National indoor athletics competitions
Athletics Indoor
Recurring sporting events established in 1963
1963 establishments in Estonia
February sporting events